Long Days of Vengeance (  is a 1967 Western film directed by Florestano Vancini. It is the only western directed by Vancini, here credited as Stan Vance. The film is a Spaghetti Western version of Alexandre Dumas' novel The Count of Monte Cristo.

Plot
Ted Barnett escapes from prison and returns to his home town to prove that he did not commit murder and also find the man who murdered his father. To do this he must disclose the respected landowner Cobb as a smuggler.

Cast 
Giuliano Gemma as Ted Barnett
Francisco Rabal as Sheriff Douglas
Gabriella Giorgelli as Dulcie
Conrado San Martín as Cobb 
Nieves Navarro as Dolly 
Doro Corrà as Morgan
Milo Quesada as Gomez

Release
Long Days of Vengeance was released in 1967. It has also been released as The Deadliest Gun Fight.

Reception
In his investigation of narrative structures in Spaghetti Western films, Fridlund groups this film with some other successful westerns where the Giuliano Gemma character is falsely accused and seeks vindication. What sets I lunghi giorni della vendetta apart is its skillful play with ironic humour and surprises.

See also
 List of Italian films of 1967

References

Footnotes

Sources

External links

1967 films
1967 Western (genre) films
Spaghetti Western films
1960s Italian-language films
Films directed by Florestano Vancini
Films scored by Armando Trovajoli
Films based on The Count of Monte Cristo
Films shot in Almería
1960s Italian films